José Ardévol (13 March 1911, in Barcelona – 7 January 1981, in Havana) was a Cuban composer and conductor of Spanish derivation.

As a child, Ardévol studied under his father, Fernando, who was a musician and conductor. He emigrated to Cuba in 1930, and from 1934 to 1952 was the director of the Orquestra de cámara de la Habana. He was a professor in Cuba from 1936 to 1951, teaching in universities in Havana and Oriente. In 1942 he founded a movement called Grupo de renovación musical, which included several of his students devoted to his aesthetic ideals. He conducted the orchestra of the government's Ministry of Education beginning in 1959. He continued teaching, working as a professor of composition at Havana Conservatory from 1965 and at the National School of Music from 1968.

Ardévol's early compositions fall generally into the style of neoclassicism, but later in his life he began to explore the techniques of aleatory music and serialism. Some of his vocal works praise communism and address other political/revolutionary topics.

Works
Note:this list is incomplete.
3 symphonies
2 Cuban suites for orchestra
Forma, ballet, 1942
La burla de Don Pedro a caballo, for soloists, chorus and orchestra, 1943
Cantos de la Revolución, vocal work, 1962
Che comandante, cantata, 1968
Lenin, vocal work, 1970
Sonata for guitar
6 Sonate a 3, chamber work
3 piano sonatas
Tensiones, for piano left hand
1933 – "Study in the form of Prelude and Fugue" for percussion ensemble
1934 – "Suite" for percussion ensemble
1942 – "Preludio a 11" for percussion ensemble

References
Don Randel. The Harvard Biographical Dictionary of Music. Harvard, 1996, p. 24.

Cuban composers
Male composers
20th-century classical composers
1911 births
1981 deaths
Male classical composers
20th-century male musicians
Spanish emigrants to Cuba
Cuban male musicians